William Thomas Gray (born January 13, 1938) is an American actor, competitive motorcycle racer and inventor.

Personal life
Gray was born in Los Angeles, to William H. and Beatrice Gray. His mother was an actress, and both had appeared in Abbott and Costello Meet the Killer, Boris Karloff (in separated scenes), a 1949 horror comedy.  He acted in more than 200 movies. He acted with stars such as Humphrey Bogart, Doris Day, Bob Hope, William Holden, Michael Rennie, Judith Anderson, Pat O'Brien and Barbara Stanwyck. He did not attend school and was educated by teachers hired by the film studios, often having class in tents set up on studio lots. He portrayed a young Jim Thorpe in Jim Thorpe – All-American and starred in the science fiction film The Day the Earth Stood Still. He portrayed Tagg "Bull's Eye" Oakley, younger brother of Annie Oakley in the pilot episode of Annie Oakley. He starred in the television series Father Knows Best and was nominated for the Primetime Emmy Award for Outstanding Supporting Actor in a Comedy Series. His father died when he was 16, while he was working on the show. He was cast as Plato in Rebel Without a Cause but because a delay in shooting interfered with his commitment to Father Knows Best he had to give up the role. He was arrested for marijuana possession in 1962 and served 45 days in jail, which effectively ended his acting career. From 1970 to 1995 he was a Class A motorcycle speedway racer and race promoter. He then turned to inventing and entrepreneurship. He is a motorcycle collector and businessman. Gray was married to and divorced from Helena Kallianiotes (1967–1969) and Donna Wilkes (1981–1981). , Gray lives in Topanga, California in the same house he bought in 1957 while working on Father Knows Best.

Filmography

Film

Television

References

Bibliography 
 
 Holmstrom, John (1996). The Moving Picture Boy: An International Encyclopaedia from 1895 to 1995. Norwich: Michael Russell, pp. 206–207.

External links

Living people
American male child actors
1938 births
American male film actors
American male television actors
Businesspeople from Los Angeles
Male actors from Los Angeles
People from Topanga, California
20th-century American male actors